Planodema is a genus of longhorn beetles of the subfamily Lamiinae, containing the following species:

 Planodema albopicta (Hintz, 1919)
 Planodema alboreticulata Breuning, 1954
 Planodema albosternalis Breuning, 1950
 Planodema andrei Gilmour, 1956
 Planodema bimaculata (Aurivillius, 1916)
 Planodema bimaculatoides Téocchi & Sudre, 2002
 Planodema cantaloubei Breuning, 1954
 Planodema congoensis (Breuning, 1942)
 Planodema femorata (Gahan, 1890)
 Planodema ferreirai Breuning, 1971
 Planodema ferruginea (Breuning, 1950)
 Planodema flavosparsa (Aurivillius, 1910)
 Planodema flavovittata Breuning, 1947
 Planodema freyi Breuning, 1955
 Planodema granulata (Aurivillius, 1928)
 Planodema griseolineata (Breuning, 1938)
 Planodema leonensis (Breuning, 1936)
 Planodema mirei Lepesme & Breuning, 1955
 Planodema mourgliai Teocchi, 1994
 Planodema multilineata Breuning, 1940
 Planodema namibiensis Adlbauer, 1998
 Planodema nigra (Breuning, 1942)
 Planodema nigrosparsa (Aurivillius, 1914)
 Planodema parascorta Veiga Ferreira, 1971
 Planodema peraffinis Breuning, 1970
 Planodema rufosuturalis Breuning, 1956
 Planodema scorta (Thomson, 1858)
 Planodema senegalensis Breuning, 1972
 Planodema similis Breuning, 1958
 Planodema strandi (Breuning, 1940)
 Planodema unicolor Jordan, 1903

References

Theocridini